Kim Dorota Clarke (born January 31, 1965 in Tulsa) is an American former handball player who competed in the 1988 Summer Olympics(Seoul, South Korea), in the 1992 Summer Olympics(Barcelona, Spain), and in the 1996 Summer Olympics(Atlanta, Georgia, USA). Kim Clarke graduated from St. Ambrose University in 1991, where she played on the Women's Basketball team, including her sophomore(1988–89) and senior(1990–91) season where she helped the team get to the NAIA (National Association of Intercollegiate Athletics) Final Four.

References

External links
 

1965 births
Living people
Sportspeople from Tulsa, Oklahoma
American female handball players
Olympic handball players of the United States
Handball players at the 1988 Summer Olympics
Handball players at the 1992 Summer Olympics
Handball players at the 1996 Summer Olympics
21st-century American women
Medalists at the 1995 Pan American Games
Medalists at the 1987 Pan American Games
Pan American Games gold medalists for the United States
Pan American Games medalists in handball